The following table indicates the party of elected officials in the U.S. state of Iowa:
Governor
Lieutenant Governor
Secretary of State
Attorney General
State Auditor
State Treasurer
Secretary of Agriculture

The table also indicates the historical party composition in the:
State Senate
State House of Representatives
State delegation to the U.S. Senate
State delegation to the U.S. House of Representatives

For years in which a presidential election was held, the table indicates which party's nominees received the state's electoral votes.

1846–1920

1921–present

References

See also
Governor of Iowa
Elections in Iowa

Government of Iowa
Iowa